Yeah Yeah may refer to:
 "Yeah Yeah" (Sabrina song), 1990
 "Yeah Yeah" (Bodyrox song), 2006
 "Yeah Yeah" (Willy Moon song), 2012
 Yeah Yeah Records, an American record label
 "Yeah Yeah", a song by Cheryl Cole from Messy Little Raindrops
 "Yeah Yeah", a song by Cyndi Lauper from She's So Unusual
 "Yeah Yeah", a song by Jaden Smith from The Sunset Tapes: A Cool Tape Story
 "Yeah, Yeah", a song by Nik Kershaw from You've Got to Laugh
 "Yeah Yeah", a song by Travis Scott featuring Young Thug

See also
 Yeah (disambiguation)
 Yeah Yeah Yeah (disambiguation)
 Yé-yé, a 1960s style of French pop music
 "Yeh Yeh", a 1963 song by Georgie Fame
 Yeah Yeah Yeah Yeah, the Bikini Kill side of a 1993 split album with Huggy Bear
 "Yeah Yeah Yeah Yeah Yeah", a 1988 song by The Pogues
 "She Loves You", a 1963 song by the Beatles